The 1936 Marquette Golden Avalanche football team was an American football team that represented Marquette University as an independent during the 1936 college football season. In its 15th and final season under head coach Frank Murray, the team compiled a 7–2 record (7–1 in the regular season) and outscored opponents by a total of 136 to 60. The team played its home games at Marquette Stadium in Milwaukee.

In the post-season, Marquette played TCU in the inaugural Cotton Bowl Classic, losing to by a 16–6 score. Marquette led, 6–3, in the first quarter, but TCU quarterback Sammy Baugh threw a 55-yard touchdown pass to give TCU the lead.

Marquette was led by quarterback Ray Buivid. Buivid finished third in the voting for the 1936 Heisman Trophy and later became the first quarterback to throw five touchdown passes in a National Football League game. Arthur Guepe also starred in the backfield for the 1936 Marquette team. Guepe returned a punt 60 yards in the 1937 Cotton Bowl, the first touchdown in Cotton Bowl history.

Schedule

Rankings

Game summaries

Wisconsin

Source:

In their 1935 meeting, Marquette defeated the rival Wisconsin Badgers 33–0 and with many players returning from that squad entered the game as an eight to five favorite. On the road at Camp Randall Stadium the Golden Avalanche were victorious 12–6. Both of Marquette's touchdowns came on a pair of Arthur Guepe receptions from Ray Buivid in the first and third quarters. The Badgers responded with their lone touchdown in the fourth quarter when Irv Windward threw a three-yard touchdown pass to Roy Bellin. Although the Badgers outgained the Golden Avalanche in total offense 201 yards to 177, they lost the game 12–6.

Saint Louis

Source:

A week after their victory over Wisconsin to open the season, Marquette traveled to Soldier Field in Chicago and defeated the Saint Louis Billikens, 32–6. The Golden Avalanche took a 6–0 lead on their first possession after driving 65-yards with Ray Buivid making the touchdown score after he recovered his own fumble from six-yards out. Their lead was then extended further to 13–0 on the second play of the second quarter when Arthur Guepe scored on a 72-yard touchdown run. After a Guepe touchdown run extended the Marquette lead to 20–0 in the third, the Golden Avalanche scored on a pair of fourth-quarter touchdowns. Both scores came on touchdown passes to Raymond Sonnenberg, the first from Guepe and the second from Buivid. The Billikens did score a late touchdown to ruin the shutout after Ralph Hemp connected with Carl Totsch for a 35-yard touchdown. Marquette outgained Saint Louis in total offense 318 yards to 91 in their 32–6 victory.

Kansas State

Source:

In the first game played at Marquette Stadium for the season, the Golden Avalanche defeated the Kansas State Wildcats 13–0. After a scoreless tie through three quarters, Marquette scored a touchdown on the second play of the fourth quarter when Al Guepe scored on a three-yard run. Arthur Guepe then scored the final Golden Avalanche points later in the quarter. Although the Wildcats outgained Marquette in total offensive yardage 164 to 127 yards, the Golden Avalanche won 13–0.

Michigan State

Source:

On homecoming at Marquette, the Golden Avalanche defeated the previously unbeaten Michigan State Spartans 13–7. After a scoreless first quarter, Marquette scored first after Ray Buivid threw a 40-yard touchdown pass to Arthur Guepe to give the Golden Avalanche a 6–0 halftime lead. In the third quarter, the Spartans took a 7–6 lead after John Pingel threw a seven-yard touchdown strike to Ernest Bremer. Trailing for the first time all season, Marquette secured the 13–7 victory with a fourth-quarter touchdown. The score came on a Ray Buivid touchdown pass to Herbert Anderson.

Saint Mary's

Source:

Before the largest crowd to ever witness a Marquette football game at Chicago's Soldier Field, the Golden Avalanche defeated the Saint Mary's Gaels, 20–6. Ray Buivid scored the first touchdown of the game on a 13-yard run to give Marquette a 7–0 lead. On the ensuing Gaels drive, Saint Mary's quarterback Edward O'Laughlin threw an interception that was returned by Buivid 75-yards for a touchdown and a 13–0 Golden Avalanche lead. O'Laughlin responded on the ensuing 65-yard drive with a rushing touchdown to cut the Marquette lead to 13–6. The final points of the game came late in the fourth quarter when Red Higgins caught a deflected Buivid pass for a touchdown. The 20–6 loss by the Gaels was their worst intersectional defeat since Slip Madigan took over as their head coach in 1921.

Creighton

Source:

In the 1936 homecoming game for the Creighton Bluejays, the visiting Golden Avalanche did not score an offensive touchdown, but was able to secure a 7–6 victory to remain undefeated for the season. After a scoreless first, Creighton scored the first points of the game in the second quarter. Frank Wilcox intercepted a Ray Buivid pass and returned it for a touchdown. Frank Jones then missed the extra point and the Bluejays took a 6–0 lead, which they retained through the fourth quarter. In the fourth, Arthur Guepe returned a Creighton punt 80-yards for an apparent touchdown only to be called back due to a Marquette offsides penalty. After failing to score on the ensuing drive and holding the Bluejays scoreless on their next possession, Guepe returned the next Creighton punt 75-yards for a game-tying touchdown. Ward Cuff then successfully converted the extra point and the Golden Avalanche took a 7–6 lead that they would not relinquish to remain undefeated.

Ole Miss

Source:

In the final regular season home game, Marquette shutout the Ole Miss, 33–0. After a scoreless first, Arthur Guepe scored the first of his three touchdowns on a 14-yard run in the second quarter to give Marquette a 7–0 lead after a successful extra point. Later in the period, Ray Buivid threw a five-yard touchdown strike to Raymond Sonnenberg to cap an 11-play, 80-yard drive. The Golden Avalanche lead was then extended to 20–0 after a one-yard Guepe touchdown run in the third quarter. In the fourth quarter, Guepe scored his final touchdown of the game on a 40-yard punt return and Buivid connected with LeRoy McMahon on a 27-yard touchdown pass to make the final score 33–0.

Duquesne

Source:

Before the largest crowd to ever see Duquesne play at Forbes Field, the Dukes shutout the favored Golden Avalanche 13–0 for their first loss of the season. Boyd Brumbaugh was responsible for both of the Dukes' touchdowns. The first came on a Brumbaugh pass to Ernie Hefferle on a faked reverse in the first and the second on a three-yard run in the fourth quarter.

TCU

Source:

With a regular season record of 7–1, on December 16 the TCU Horned Frogs were granted permission from the Southwest Conference to compete against the Golden Avalanche in the inaugural Cotton Bowl Classic in Dallas, Texas. Billed as a battle between college football's two most prolific passes of the previous two seasons, TCU's Sammy Baugh and Marquette's Ray Buivid, the Horned Frogs prevailed 16–6. L. D. Meyer opened the scoring with a 33-yard field goal to give TCU an early 3–0 lead. The Avalanche responded with its only points of the game later in the quarter when Arthur Guepe returned a punt 60-yards to give Marquette its only lead of the game at 6–3. The Horned Frogs retook the lead at the end of the first quarter when Baugh threw a 55-yard touchdown pass to Meyer to give TCU a 10–6 lead which they would not relinquish. The final points of the game came in the second quarter on an 18-yard Vic Montgomery touchdown strike again to Meyer to give the Horned Frogs the 16–6 victory.

Personnel

Coaching staff
The Golden Avalanche was led by head coach Frank Murray who entered his 15th season in that role at Marquette. He resigned his position in February 1937 to assume the role of head coach at Virginia.

Players

Herbert Anderson
Robert Boylan
Ray Buivid, left halfback
Morgan Busch
Oliver Butler
James Fenimore Cooper
Joseph Cuchetti
Ward Cuff
Walter Eichenberger
Al Guepe
Arthur Guepe, quarterback

Robert Hanel
Howard Hansen
Norman Helding
Vincent Hotton
Roy Hovel
William Jennings
Harold Kieffer
George Knipp
Ralph Kuhn
Joseph Lauterbach

Wallace Lauterbach
Roger Lumb
Joseph Matt
Earl McEssy
LeRoy McMahon
Elroy Mieritz
Joseph Mosovsky
Edwin Niemi
John O'Melia
John Puestow

Myles Reif
Delbert Rider
Edward St. Eve
Roy Schoemann
Carl Siefert
Raymond Sonnenberg
Lloyd Tappa
Patrick Toal
Anthony Weiler
Brendan Williams

References:

References
General

 

Specific

Marquette
Marquette Golden Avalanche football seasons
Marquette Golden Avalanche football